Earias biplaga, the spiny bollworm, is a moth in the family Nolidae. The species was first described by Francis Walker in 1866. It is found throughout subtropical Africa including Atlantic and Indian Ocean islands.

Their length is about 10–12 mm, wingspan about 18–25 mm and it is characterised by a dark purplish-brown terminal fringe on the forewing.

The larvae feed on species of Fabaceae and Malvaceae. It is considered as a pest to cotton and cacao.

References

External links

Nolidae
Moths described in 1866
Moths of Cape Verde
Moths of the Comoros
Moths of Africa
Moths of Madagascar
Moths of Mauritius
Moths of Réunion
Moths of Seychelles
Moths of the Middle East